Jrashen is a village in the Artashat Municipality of the Ararat Province of Armenia.

References

External links 

World Gazeteer: Armenia – World-Gazetteer.com

Populated places in Ararat Province
Populated places established in 1928
Cities and towns built in the Soviet Union